Live at the Fillmore East is a posthumous live album by Jimi Hendrix released on February 23, 1999. The album documents Hendrix's performances with the Band of Gypsys at the Fillmore East on December 31, 1969, and January 1, 1970. It is drawn from the same performances as, and can be seen as an extended complement to, the album Band of Gypsys, consisting mostly of songs not on the original album.

Since its original release, additional recordings from the Fillmore East performances have been issued on West Coast Seattle Boy: The Jimi Hendrix Anthology (2010), Machine Gun: The Fillmore East First Show (2013), and Songs for Groovy Children: The Fillmore East Concerts (2019).

Critical reception

Track listing
All details are taken from the original MCA Records CD liner notes. All tracks written by Jimi Hendrix, except where noted.

Personnel
 Jimi Hendrixguitar, lead vocals (except those by Miles)
 Buddy Milesdrums, backing vocals, lead vocals on "We Gotta Live Together", "Changes", "Stop"
 Billy Coxbass guitar, backing vocals

References

Live at the Fillmore East albums
Albums produced by Eddie Kramer
Live albums published posthumously
Jimi Hendrix live albums
1999 live albums
MCA Records live albums